Elk Mountain, Utah refers to several things. Most recently, a ski resort near Beaver, Utah.

However, Elk Meadows Ski Area closed but reopened under new ownership. The ski area is now called Eagle Point Ski Resort and reopened in December 2010. Eagle Point has added many new amenities including restaurants, hot tubs etc.

History 
In 1854, Brigham Young, the territorial governor of Utah and President of the LDS Church, directed a group of a dozen men to establish a major control point on the Old Spanish Trail in southeastern Utah on the site of the current city of Moab. Additional settlers followed, but conflicts with the local Ute Indians wiped out the settlement.

The demise of the Elk Mountain Mission marked one of the rare failures for a Mormon settlement during the church's widespread colonization of the West under President Brigham Young. For more than two decades afterward, no permanent settlers lived in the Moab area. The return of permanent settlers did not happen until 1877, when prospector William Granstaff and a trapper known as “Frenchie” arrived in the Spanish Valley area and moved into the old fort itself.

References

Buildings and structures in Beaver County, Utah
Populated places in Beaver County, Utah
Ski areas and resorts in Utah